Arthur M. Blank (born September 27, 1942) is an American businessman , the owner of the Atlanta Falcons and Atlanta United and a co-founder of the home improvement retailer The Home Depot.

He also currently owns two professional sports teams based in Atlanta, Georgia - the Atlanta Falcons of the National Football League (NFL) and Atlanta United of Major League Soccer (MLS), the latter of which having won the 2018 MLS Cup, thus giving him an MLS Cup Championship to his credit.

Life
Arthur Blank was born to a Jewish family in Flushing, New York. He was born to Max Blank, a pharmacist, and Molly Blank. He has an older brother named Michael. Blank graduated from Stuyvesant High School in New York City.
After graduating from Babson Institute in 1963, Blank was hired by Arthur Young and Company, where he was a senior accountant.  He later joined the Daylin corporation, where he rose to become president of Elliott's Drug Stores/Stripe Discount Stores, a division of Daylin. When Daylin decided to sell off that division, Blank moved to another division, Handy Dan Home Improvement Centers. Bernard Marcus was CEO of Handy Dan and Blank was vice president of finance when both were fired in 1978 as part of an internal power struggle.

In 1978, Blank co-founded Home Depot with Marcus. New York investment banker Ken Langone assembled the initial group of investors and merchandising expert Patrick Farrah helped founders realize their vision of one-stop shopping for the do-it-yourselfer. The store revolutionized the home improvement business with its warehouse concept and Blank and Marcus became billionaires as a result. Blank spent 19 years as the company's president before succeeding Marcus as CEO. Blank retired from the company in 2001 as co-chairman. He received his MBA from Harvard.

Today, Blank is the Chairman of AMB Group LLC, parent company of the Atlanta Falcons and Atlanta United. He is also chairman of The Arthur Blank Family Foundation, and serves on the Board of Trustees of Emory University.

In March 2020, Blank's foundation announced it would donate nearly $5.4 million to aid the coronavirus pandemic response in Georgia and Montana.

In October 2020 it was announced that the new Children's Healthcare of Atlanta hospital would be named after Arthur Blank after his foundation donated $200 million to the project. The Arthur M. Blank Hospital is expected to open in 2025.

Sports ownership
In February 2002, Blank purchased the Atlanta Falcons franchise in the National Football League from owner Taylor Smith, the son of team founder Rankin M. Smith Sr. In September 2004, he bought the Arena Football League franchise, the Georgia Force; he moved the team to the city of Atlanta after it had spent several years in suburban Gwinnett County.

Blank has expressed serious interest in purchasing other franchises. In early 2006, he temporarily withdrew from contention as a potential buyer of the Atlanta Braves of Major League Baseball. Some months later, Blank re-entered serious talks with Time Warner and a report indicated that a sale was imminent. However, in February 2007, the Braves completed the sale of the team to Liberty Media. Blank has also founded an expansion Major League Soccer franchise named Atlanta United FC that began play in 2017. The club shares Mercedes-Benz Stadium with the Falcons.

Personal life
Blank has been married three times and divorced twice, with a third divorce pending. He has three children with his first wife, Diana Blank (born 1942): Kenny Blank, Dena Blank Kimball, and Danielle Blank Thomsen; they divorced in 1993. In 1995, he married Stephanie V. Blank (born 1968), a Blowing Rock, North Carolina, native and Appalachian State University graduate. They met when she worked as a designer at a Home Depot store in Atlanta. They had three children - Joshua Blank, Max Blank, and Kylie Blank - before being divorced. In June 2016, Blank married Angela Macuga (born 1968), who had three children from a previous marriage.  They announced their pending divorce on January 1, 2019.

Blank owns Mountain Sky Guest Ranch and West Creek Ranch outside Yellowstone National Park in Paradise Valley, Montana. He also owns several PGA TOUR Superstores. He is a signatory of The Giving Pledge committing himself to give away at least 50% of his wealth to charitable causes.

On February 9, 2016, Blank disclosed that he had treatable prostate cancer. On March 17, 2016, Blank announced that he is cancer-free following treatment.

References

External links
 Forbes profile

1942 births
Living people
American billionaires
American businesspeople in retailing
Arena Football League executives
Atlanta Falcons owners
Atlanta United FC
Cox Enterprises
Giving Pledgers
21st-century philanthropists
Babson College alumni
Stuyvesant High School alumni
The Home Depot people
Businesspeople from Atlanta
Sportspeople from Queens, New York
Jewish American sportspeople
Blank
Blank
Chairmen and investors of soccer clubs in the United States
20th-century American businesspeople
21st-century American businesspeople
21st-century American Jews